Annabel Dover (born 1975 in Liverpool) is a British artist. She has a BA (Hons) in fine art from Newcastle University (1998), an MA in fine art from Central Saint Martins, London (2002), and a teaching qualification (PGCE) in art and design from the University of Cambridge (2003).

Dover uses a variety of media including painting, photography, video, drawing and cyanotype. Her approach is to explore social relationships that are mediated through objects. The Imperial War Museum acquired a set of Dover's cyanotypes which also appear in Blue Mythologies: Reflections on a Colour by Carol Mavor.

Selected collections 
Priseman Seabrook Collection, UK
The Imperial War Museum

Selected exhibitions 
2006 – Trace and Nostalgia, Persimmon Gallery, Los Angeles, USA
2010 – Streaming Film Festival, The Hague, Netherlands
2010 – Whistlejacket, CoExist, Southend, England
2014 – Unstable Ground, Paper, Manchester, England
2014 – News from Nowhere, Kelmscott House, National Trust, London
2014 – Artist in Residence, Aldeburgh International Poetry Festival, England

References

External links 
 Contemporary British Painting

Artists from Liverpool
21st-century British painters
Living people
Alumni of Newcastle University
Alumni of Central Saint Martins
1975 births
21st-century British women artists